Trefarthen is a village in the  community of Llanidan, Ynys Môn, Wales, which is 125.6 miles (202.1 km) from Cardiff and 209.2 miles (336.7 km) from London.

Of historical and archaeological interest are a Georgian mansion and the possible site of a 16th-century house.

References

See also
List of localities in Wales by population

Villages in Anglesey